Pam Byrnes (born June 25, 1947) is a former Democratic State Representative in the Michigan State House of Representatives, representing the 52nd District, which covers parts of Washtenaw County. On July 18, 2013, Pam Byrnes announced that she will run as a Democratic candidate to challenge Republican Representative Tim Walberg in Michigan's 7th congressional district.

Career
Byrnes is a lawyer and small business owner, and lives on a small farm outside of Chelsea, Michigan with her husband, Kent Brown. She is the former director of Washtenaw County Friend of the Court. She served as the Executive Director of the University of Michigan-Shanghai Jiao Tong University Joint Institute, a program that provides University of Michigan students and faculty a platform to engage in engineering education and research in an international setting, often collaborating with Michigan businesses, such as General Motors and TRW Automotive.

State legislative career 
Byrnes was elected to the State House in 2004, beating Republican Joe Yekulis by over 5000 votes. She competed with Yekulis for the section of western Washtenaw County that he had represented on the County Commission for the past decade. In 2006, Byrnes was the lone Democrat running for State Representative in the district. She faced Republican Shannon Brown in the general election, and she was reelected by over 11000 votes. Byrnes ran for re-election to the State House for the final time in November 2008, due to Michigan term limits. Byrnes' Republican opponent was Eric Lielbriedis, of Saline. She was reelected with over 62% of the vote, and a margin of over 16000 votes. While in the House, Byrnes served as House Speaker Pro Tempore.

On December 13, 2009, Pam Byrnes announced her candidacy for State Senate in Michigan's 18th district at the Ypsilanti Freighthouse in Ypsilanti's Depot Town. Five days before the election, an article in a Michigan newspaper revealed that the Great Lakes Education Project (GLEP), a Political Action Committee funded in part by Republicans Dick & Betsy DeVos, made two independent expenditures promoting Pam Byrnes and one independent expenditure criticizing her opponent. GLEP lobbies for choice, accountability and quality in education and assists candidates that support education reform. Byrnes lost the Democratic primary to Rebekah Warren, 55-41%. Warren would go on to win the general election.

2014 Congressional election 
On July 18, 2013, Pam Byrnes announced her candidacy for Congress in Michigan's 7th congressional district. In announcing her candidacy, Byrnes stated, "Washington is broken and Rep. Tim Walberg is part of the problem. Michigan's middle-class is paying the price for his partisan politics that put special interests and corporation before working families." Byrnes was endorsed by EMILY's List. She would go to lose by 53% to 41%.

Electoral history

References

External links 
 Pam Byrnes for Congress campaign site
 Michigan House Democrats, Michigan House Democratic Site
 Michigan Democratic Party

1947 births
Living people
Democratic Party members of the Michigan House of Representatives
Women state legislators in Michigan
University of Michigan staff
21st-century American politicians
21st-century American women politicians
People from Washtenaw County, Michigan